Annuaires Afrique (French), or AfricaPhonebooks (English), is a group of African online telephone directories owned by The Global Super Pages.  It currently serves the following areas:

Benin
Burkina Faso
Burundi
Cameroon
Chad
Central African Republic
Congo (Brazzaville)
Côte d'Ivoire
Djibouti
Equatorial Guinea
Gabon
Guinea
Mali
Mauritania
Niger
Rwanda
Senegal
Togo

Service is planned for the following countries.

Algeria 
Angola 
Comoros 
French Polynesia 
Madagascar 
Mauritius 
Morocco 
Tunisia

The Global Super Pages' Asian service now comprises Cambodia, Greater Bangkok, Laos, Malaysia and Myanmar.

See also
Blue pages
White pages
Yellow pages

External links
Annuaires Afrique 
Annuaire France  

Telecommunications in Africa